Metarctia rubripuncta is a moth of the subfamily Arctiinae. It was described by George Hampson in 1898. It is found in Burundi, Cameroon, Republic of the Congo, Democratic Republic of the Congo, Ethiopia, Gabon, Kenya, Rwanda, Tanzania, Uganda and Zimbabwe.

References

Metarctia
Moths described in 1898
Moths of Africa